Lepidodiscus may refer to:
 Lepidodiscus (diatom), an extinct genus of prehistoric diatoms
 Lepidodiscus (echinoderm), an extinct genus of prehistoric echinoderms